Xertigny station (French: Gare de Xertigny) is a railway station serving the commune of Xertigny, Vosges department, France. It is located on the Blainville to Damelevières à Lure railway. The station is owned and operated by SNCF, in the TER Grand Est regional rail network and is served by TER trains.

History 
The train station was opened by the Compagnie des chemins de fer de l'Est on 24 September 1863, along with the section from Épinal to Aillevillers.

In 2018, the SNCF recorded 1,036 passenger movements through the station, a slight increase from the previous year of only 978.

See also 

 List of SNCF stations in Grand Est

References 

Railway stations in Vosges (department)
Railway stations in France opened in 1863